Carlos Domingo Maldonado Curti (born 21 July 1963) is a Chilean politician and lawyer. He was a member of the Radical Party and is currently linked to Freemasonry.

Maldonado was General Undersecretary of Government (2006–07) Minister of Justice (2007–10) during the first government of President Michelle Bachelet.

He was pre-candidate of the Radical Party of Chile (PR). Later, on 2 September 2022, he was suspended from the PR for having promoted the «Reject» option towards the 2022 Chilean constitutional plebiscite, which was won by that option with a 62% of the votes.

Biography
He was born and raised in Cerro Jiménez in Valparaíso. His father ―a former radical leader― retired as an employee of the Empresa de Ferrocarriles del Estado (EFE, «State Railways Company»), the same company where his grandfather had been a worker.

His primary and secondary education were at the E-310 School, and the Eduardo de la Barra High School, both public schools. He graduated from the University of Valparaíso School of Law and received a master's degree in law from the University of Chile.

In 2018, Maldonado was elected as the president of his party.

On 27 March 2019, he joined with Sebastián Piñera.

In the primaries of the Constituent Unity he lost against the candidates Yasna Provoste (winner; christian-democratic) and Paula Narváez (socialist).

Personal life

Football
He is supporter of Santiago Wanderers.

References

External links
 

1963 births
Living people
Chilean people
Chilean people of Italian descent
People from Valparaíso
Eduardo de la Barra Lyceum alumni
University of Valparaíso alumni
University of Chile alumni
Chilean politicians
21st-century Chilean politicians
Radical Party of Chile politicians
Radical Social Democratic Party of Chile politicians
Democrats (Chile) politicians
Chilean Freemasons